A Way with Words is a public radio show and podcast, originally produced by KPBS.

A Way with Words may also refer to:
A Way with Words, album by Kenny Werner (Cowbell) 2009
"A Way with Words", song by An Angle from We Can Breathe under Alcohol 2005 
"A Way with Words", song by Moraz and Bruford from Flags (Moraz and Bruford album)
"A Way with Words", song by Robert Plant Carry Fire  2017
"Way with Words (Bahamas song)", 2017 sing by Canadian musician Bahamas
 Way with Words, 2020 single album by South Korean group Kard
"Way with Words", a song by the Vels from House of Miracles

See also
 Away with Words, 1999 film